Hallo is a 2007 Indian Malayalam-language comedy thriller film written and directed by the Rafi Mecartin duo. The film stars Mohanlal and Parvathy Melton, with Jagathy Sreekumar, Siddique, K. B. Ganesh Kumar, Madhu, and Samvrutha Sunil in important roles. The music was composed by Alex Paul. The film received positive reviews from critics. Critics praised Mohanlal"s performance. The film was also a major commercial success. It was remade in Telugu as Naa Style Veru (2009) and in Kannada as Manjunatha BA LLB (2012). The plot of the movie was reported to have been partially borrowed from the 2004 movie Cellular.

Plot
Sivaraman is a once-brilliant advocate who now seems to be in a self-destructive mode. All the time he is portrayed  in a highly intoxicated state. His clients had abandoned him a long time ago. But he has a very devout follower Chandy. Whenever Sivaraman gets into one of his drunken brawls, it is Chandy who rescues him.

Strangely, that doesn't diminish Sivaraman's public relation skills. After one particularly bad fight, he ends up becoming good buddies with three notorious rowdies in the area: Vadakkancherry Vakkachen / 'Vedakku' Vakkan, Bathery Bappu / Kolakolli and Pattambi Ravi / 'Chattambi' Ravi. Soon, they too join his gang of loyalists.

The reason why this once-hotshot advocate had hit the bottle is revealed later: he was in love with a girl named Priya. But, his father and brother weren't happy about it.  They come up with a very cruel way of ending the relationship. They lock Sivaraman in a room in the house on the day Sivaraman and Priya decided to elope. Priya, unaware of this happening waits for Sivaraman. A group of gangsters see Priya waiting late into the night, molests her and then kills her. When Sivaraman finds out about it, he is devastated and reacts by becoming an alcoholic.

Then one day, he receives a phone call on his mobile phone from a stranger named Parvathi. She reveals that she is the daughter of a local Marwari banker. On the phone she tells him that her life is in grave danger and begs him to rescue her.

Parvathi is the daughter of Bada Bhai, the owner of a very successful bank - Dalal & Dalal. The bank is jointly owned by him and his brothers and relatives. They want to take control of the bank by killing Parvathi. When Sivaraman finds out that the threat is from her family, he takes her home and pretends to be her husband.

Then begins the battle of wits and muscles with her greedy relatives. Slowly, Parvathi gets impressed by his brilliance and ends up falling in love with him.

Cast

Mohanlal as Advocate Sivaraman Nambiar
Parvati Melton as Parvathi 
Jagathy Sreekumar as Chandykunju, Sivaraman's friend
Siddique as Mahesh Bhai, Saab's brother
Madhu as Bada Saab, Parvathi's father
K. B. Ganesh Kumar as Sudheesh Nambiar IPS, Sivaraman's brother
Janardhanan as Advocate M. N. Nambiar, Sivaraman's father
Spadikam George as Vadakkancherry Vakkachen aka Vedakku Vakkan, Sivaraman's friend
Bheeman Raghu as Bathery Bappu aka Kolakolli, Sivaraman's friend
Mohan Raj as Pattambi Ravi aka Chattambi Ravi, Sivaraman's friend
Kundara Johny as Aravindakshan, Police Commissioner
Jagadish as Advocate Thomas Jacob
Rizabawa as Dinu Bhai / John Samuel
Suraj Venjaramoodu as Sub Inspector Stephen
Salim Kumar as Chidambaram  
Abu Salim as Hassan, Goon
Ajith Kollam as Karim, Goon
Fathima Babu as Lathika, Sivaraman's Mother
Saiju Kurup as Praveen
Madhu Warrier as Susheel Bhai
Samvrutha Sunil as Priya, Sivaraman's lover
Ashokan as Sebastian (Cameo)
Ambika Mohan as Parvathi's relative
Sona Nair as Liza
Sruthy John as Parvathi's relative
Manka Mahesh as Parvathi's relative
Remadevi as Parvathi's relative
Indulekha as Alice Sebastian 
Bindu Murali as Doctor
Mini Arun as Chidambaram's first wife
Praseetha Menon as Chidambaram's second wife
Maya Vishwanath as Parvathi's relative

Music

The songs were composed by Alex Paul and the lyrics were written by Vayalar Sarath Chandra Varma.

Production 
Jyothika was selected as lead heroine, but was replaced by Parvathy due to her prior commitments in Telugu and Tamil films.

Reception
The film was released on 5 July 2007, in 56 screens in Kerala. The film had the biggest ever opening day collection for a Malayalam film in 2007. Hallo was a blockbuster at the box office. It went on to become the second highest grosser of the year behind Mayavi.

The film received generally positive reviews from critics. Sify gave the film a positive review writing, "What makes the film tick is that the comedy combination is perfect- they want the audience to have a nice laugh and go home happy. Mohanlal the one-man entertainment troupe carries the film on his broad shoulders. The director duo has packaged it using the star's image and their slapstick script to create a laugh riot." About the technical aspects they write, "Technically the film is ok, with Bobban's set designs ( the toddy shop set), Sanjiv Shankar’s camera and Don Max's editing all which enriches the entertainer. Songs by Alex Paul are just average."

Remakes
The film was remade in Telugu as Naa Style Veru (2009) with Rajasekhar and in Kannada as Manjunatha BA LLB (2012) with Jaggesh.

References

External links

2000s Malayalam-language films
Indian comedy thriller films
Malayalam films remade in other languages
2007 films
2007 action comedy films
Films shot at Varikkasseri Mana
Films shot in Ottapalam
Films directed by Rafi–Mecartin